The N710 or Upper Jashore Road is a National Highway in Bangladesh. It is the shortest listed highway by length in Bangladesh. This road goes through a busiest commercial area of Khulna City.

Reference 

National Highways in Bangladesh